Acroclita guanchana is a moth of the family Tortricidae. It is found on the Canary Islands and Madeira.

The wingspan is 12–15 mm. The forewings are tawny reddish brown with some black scaling. The hindwings are grey with a slight rosy tinge.

The larvae have been recorded feeding on the leaves of Hypericum grandifolium.

References

Moths described in 1907
Eucosmini
Moths of Africa